Mervyn John Bower (12 January 1934 – 30 September 2013) was an Australian pair skater who competed at the 1956 and 1960 Winter Olympics in a pairing with Jacqueline Mason. In 1956 they failed to take to the ice after Bower was injured. In 1960, they placed 12th out of 13 duos.

Results
(with Mason)

References

External links
 
 
 Mervyn Bower's profile at Sports Reference.com

1934 births
2013 deaths
Australian male pair skaters
Olympic figure skaters of Australia
Figure skaters at the 1956 Winter Olympics
Figure skaters at the 1960 Winter Olympics